The Oldsmobile Series 70 is a full-size midrange automobile produced by Oldsmobile between the 1939 and 1950 model years. Oldsmobiles of this time period were in an unusual "middle" position in GM's hierarchy of automobile brands. Chevrolet and Pontiac were the budget priced models, while Buick and Cadillac were the luxury brands. GM would share their "A" body platforms between Chevrolet, Pontiac, and "B" body on Oldsmobile and Buick, while leaving Cadillac on the senior "C" platform. Oldsmobiles were then branded as "luxury level" Chevrolet's and Pontiac's, while Oldsmobiles using the "B" platform were "budget priced" Buicks and Cadillacs. 

Competitors from Ford's Mercury and Chrysler's  DeSoto brands would give customers a choice to have Oldsmobile levels of luxury, while not paying as much for a comparable Oldsmobile. GM in later years would discontinue the Series 70 and the budget Oldsmobile Series 60, and introduce the Oldsmobile 88 to push Oldsmobile upmarket, giving Chevrolet and Pontiac a better market position for a lower price. It was with this generation that all GM vehicles experienced increased width dimensions to accommodate three passengers on the front bench seat and an additional three passengers on rear bench seat installed vehicles. This was accomplished with the deletion of running board thereby adding additional room inside the passenger compartment and upgrading the floor mounted gearshift to a steering column installed transmission gear selector for the Hydramatic automatic transmission.

1939–1940

Naming standards were in flux at Oldsmobile during the late 1930s and 1940s. From 1932 through 1938 Oldsmobile had two series: "F" and "L". Series F came with a straight-6 engine and Series L came with a larger body and a straight-8 engine. Series F was renamed Series 60 in 1939 and Series L was replaced with the Series 70, with the Series 70 being powered by the straight-6 and the straight-8 respectively. The Series 60 used the GM A-body and the Series 70 used the B-body. 

In 1940 the even larger C-body was introduced to Oldsmobile and it alone was powered by the straight-8. In order to differentiate it as Oldsmobiles senior level vehicle it was named the Series 90 while remaining below the Buick Special. The series were also given names for the first time that year with the Series 60, 70, and 90 being called the Special, Dynamic, and Custom Cruiser respectively. The Hydramatic transmission, a fully clutchless automatic, debuted in the 1940 model year.

1941–1948

In 1941 both straight six- and straight eight-engines were offered on each series so to differentiate between the two the second digit was used to denote the number of cylinders, so the Dynamic 70 was replaced with the Dynamic 76 and 78. In 1942 sales literature started referring to the Series 70 as the Dynamic Cruiser 76 and 78. 

Production was delayed from 1942 until 1945 due to manufacturing efforts being devoted to World War II defense production. To celebrate the company's 44th anniversary at the time, all Oldsmobiles were installed with a small badge on the grille with "B44" attached. This was not a model designation.

In 1946 the Dynamic Cruiser Series 70 was Oldsmobile's mid-priced model, and offered both a 2-door Club Sedan and 4-door Sedan, and the second number in the series designation continued to identify if it had a straight six- or straight eight-cylinder flat-head engine. Some of the optional equipment included a choice of a 6-tube or DeLuxe 7-tube radio, electric clock, plastic steering wheel, rear window wiper for both sedans, and auxiliary driving lights. Prices listed for the Dynamic 70 DeLuxe 4-door Sedan were US$1,678 ($ in  dollars ) and 5,118 were assembled while the Dynamic 70 4-door Sedan was much more popular, selling 25,528 with a listed price of US$1,568 ($ in  dollars ). Electrical equipment was modest as the cars of this time only used a 6-volt system. The standard equipment offered Bedford cord or broadcloth upholstery, front seat retractable center armrests, rubber floor mats, painted woodgrained instrument panel, dual sun visors, dual electric windshield wipers, and an automatic choke for the carburetor for easier starts for a cold engine. Buyers who chose the DeLuxe trim package were given carpeted inserts in the rubber floor mats, a deluxe instrument with full gauges, a retractable center armrest for the rear seat, the E-Z-I anti-glare rear view mirror and an electric clock. Curiously, the Standard Series 70 had 16" wheels while the DeLuxe had 15" wheels as standard equipment.

1947 was Oldsmobile's fiftieth anniversary and other than some new two-tone exterior paint options, the standard and optional equipment and features remained carryover from previous years. A heater and windshield defroster was added to the options list for US$32 ($ in  dollars ). New branch assembly locations were added at Atlanta and Wilmington. Due to the American public taking the opportunity to purchase new vehicles to replace cars kept in service due to WWII production suspension, 38,152 2-door Club Sedans and 30,841 4-door Sedans were built, more than the Special 60 Series or the larger Custom Cruiser 98. The Dynamic 76 was produced in Australia with fewer than 120 thought to have been produced during 1947.

In 1948, when the Series 60 was renamed the Dynamic the "Cruiser" tag was dropped from the Series 70 and it was once again named the Dynamic 76 and 78.

1949–1950

The all new post-war Futuramic styling that had been introduced to the C-body Oldsmobile 98 in 1948 was brought to Oldsmobile's A-body which it now shared with Pontiac and Chevrolet in 1949, and the new name Seventy-Six, with the numbers now spelled out, became Oldsmobile's entry level model when the Series 60 was discontinued. The wheelbase was now  and was only available with the Oldsmobile straight-6 engine. The previous 78 model was retired with the 1949 introduction of the Oldsmobile 88, which shared its new Futuramic A-body platform with the Seventy-Six but was equipped with the new overhead valve Rocket V8. The nameplate "Futuramic"  identified an Oldsmobile approach to simplified driving, and the presence of an automatic transmission 1948 Oldsmobile Futuramic introduction. In its final year of 1950 the Seventy-Six continued to offer the DeLuxe trim package that was only offered on the all-new station wagon with wood exterior panels, while the Holiday hardtop coupe was briefly offered, manufacturing only 144 with the standard trim package and 394 with the DeLuxe package and a listed retail price of US$2,108 ($ in  dollars ). This particular model is particularly rare to find as it was the only time Oldsmobile offered a six-cylinder engine with the upscale hardtop feature. The hardtop was built by welding a steel roof onto the convertible body style which simplified assembly line operations.

The Seventy-Six was available in the following body styles:
 Station wagon
 Convertible
 Holiday hardtop coupé (2-door)
 Club coupé (2-door fastback)
 Club sedan (4-door fastback)
 Town Sedan (4-door fastback)

References 

70
Cars introduced in 1938
Rear-wheel-drive vehicles
Sedans
Coupés
Convertibles
Station wagons